Phyllurus gulbaru, the Gulbaru leaf-tailed gecko, is a species of gecko found in Australia. It is endemic to the extreme southern end of the Paluma Range in Queensland.

References

Phyllurus
Endemic fauna of Australia
Geckos of Australia
Reptiles described in 2003
Taxa named by Conrad J. Hoskin
Taxa named by Patrick J. Couper
Taxa named by Christopher J. Schneider (herpetologist)